Statistics of Guam League in the 1992 season.

Overview
University of Guam won the championship.

References
RSSSF

Guam Soccer League seasons
Guam
Guam
football